The Jordanian Association for Badminton was formed in 1993 and is the national governing body of Badminton in Jordan.

Tournaments
 Jordan International

Affiliation
 Badminton World Federation
 Badminton Asia Confederation
 Arab Union for Badminton

External links
Jordan Badminton Federation website
badmintonasia.org

1996 establishments in Jordan
Badminton in Jordan
National members of the Badminton World Federation
Badminton
Sports organizations established in 1996